College Springs is a city in Page County, Iowa, United States. The population was 172 at the 2020 census.

Geography
College Springs is located at  (40.620878, -95.121941).

Demographics

2010 census
As of the census of 2010, there were 214 people, 83 households, and 60 families living in the city. The racial makeup of the city was 96.7% White, 0.5% Pacific Islander, and 2.8% from two or more races.

There were 83 households, of which 30.1% had children under the age of 18 living with them, 55.4% were married couples living together, 10.8% had a female householder with no husband present, 6.0% had a male householder with no wife present, and 27.7% were non-families. 21.7% of all households were made up of individuals, and 8.4% had someone living alone who was 65 years of age or older. The average household size was 2.58 and the average family size was 2.95.

The median age in the city was 40 years. 24.3% of residents were under the age of 18; 9.3% were between the ages of 18 and 24; 21.1% were from 25 to 44; 29.3% were from 45 to 64; and 15.9% were 65 years of age or older. The gender makeup of the city was 48.1% male and 51.9% female.

2000 census
As of the census of 2000, there were 246 people, 90 households, and 72 families living in the city. The racial makeup of the city was 99.19% White and 0.81% Native American. Hispanic or Latino of any race were 0.41% of the population.

There were 90 households, out of which 34.4% had children under the age of 18 living with them, 70.0% were married couples living together, 6.7% had a female householder with no husband present, and 18.9% were non-families. 16.7% of all households were made up of individuals, and 7.8% had someone living alone who was 65 years of age or older. The average household size was 2.73 and the average family size was 3.07.

In the city the population was spread out, with 26.8% under the age of 18, 6.1% from 18 to 24, 23.2% from 25 to 44, 28.0% from 45 to 64, and 15.9% who were 65 years of age or older. The median age was 42 years. For every 100 females, there were 103.3 males. For every 100 females age 18 and over, there were 106.9 males.

The median income for a household in the city was $38,500, and the median income for a family was $37,750. Males had a median income of $27,375 versus $19,250 for females. The per capita income for the city was $15,102. About 2.4% of families and 4.3% of the population were below the poverty line, including 7.1% of those under the age of eighteen and none of those 65 or over.

Education 
South Page Community School Operates Public Schools

The school building that was Amity College now houses South Page High.

Name
The city received its name because of a school called Amity College, and the "Spring" part refers to a nearby spring, reputed to have very clear water.

References

External links

 

Cities in Iowa
Cities in Page County, Iowa